The Bare Knuckle Boxing Hall of Fame is a museum and hall of fame in Belfast, New York, dedicated to the sport of bare-knuckle boxing. It is housed in barns that were once owned by the Greco-Roman wrestling champion and physical culture pioneer William Muldoon. The heavyweight boxing champion John L. Sullivan, who fought in both bare-knuckled and gloved boxing contests, trained in these barns under Muldoon's guidance for his championship bout against Jake Kilrain in 1889. The barns were originally across Main Street from their current location, on the grounds of the Belfast Catholic Church. They were bought, moved, and restored by Scott Burt when the church became no longer interested in maintaining them. Burt opened the Hall of Fame in 2009, when it had its first induction class.

The Hall of Fame houses plaques and memorabilia associated with bare-knuckle boxers that have been inducted to the Hall of Fame, as well as exhibits devoted to the general history of bare-knuckle boxing. Each year's induction class includes bare-knuckle boxers from the classic era, modern bare-knuckle boxers, and honorary inductees. Trainers, promoters and other significant figures in the sport are also upon occasion inducted.

The Hall of Fame also serves as a memorial to Sullivan's training camp with Muldoon, a number of relics of which have survived the lengthy period when the barns sat unused. These include his original work-out rings, a ceiling mount for Sullivan's heavy bag, the slatted area of flooring on which Sullivan stood for gravity showers after training, his original swing clubs and weights, and the "room of repose" in which Sullivan and Muldoon relaxed and discussed strategy in the evenings, which includes some of Muldoon's original furniture. Sullivan and Muldoon's use of this training camp was documented by the celebrated reporter Nellie Bly, in an article she wrote for the New York World.

Inductees 
The following are the inductees into the Bare Knuckle Boxing Hall of Fame as of 6 April 2018:

Original Inductees 
Original inductees are required to have boxed completely bare-fisted (with no wraps) at some point in their career. These include living fighters and those that fought as early as the 18th century.

Honorary Inductees 
These must have brought positive spotlight to upstate New York or done a considerable service to the sport of Bare-knuckle boxing. Honorary inductees are those that have not bare knuckle boxed, that is, those listed as a 'boxer' have boxed with gloves or wraps, and inductees associated with ice hockey are inducted for their contributions to the fighting aspects of the game (to date, both hockey-related honorary inductees have been associated with the Buffalo Sabres, who play  from Belfast). The honorary inductees were included as an acknowledgement that bare-knuckle boxing ended as a mainstream sport over a century ago, and that the honorary inductee system allows notable figures that promoted activity similar to bare knuckle boxing, who might be more recognizable to modern audiences, to be included in the Hall.

Marie Backus Person of the Year

Marie Backus Team of the Year

Induction Events 

For the inaugural induction ceremony in 2009, former undisputed heavyweight champion Leon Spinks was a special guest.

From 2011-2013 there was a breakfast in honour of a particular person each year, in 2011 this was Jack Green, Buffalo Ring 44 President. In 2012 the breakfast was in honour of Jeff Mengel, who had trained the fighter Jimmy Holmes in the barns in Belfast, New York. The 2013 breakfast was in honour of Zeke Wilson, author of the book The Eighth Round, combatant of prejudice in boxing and a noted boxer himself.

Current Recognized Champions  

With the introduction of modern day sanctioned bare knuckle boxing events both inside and outside of the United States, the Bare Knuckle Boxing Hall of Fame, in conjunction with the National Police Gazette, currently recognizes several individuals as World and American Bare Knuckle Boxing champions. The following individuals are recognized as the current champions.

Modern Era Championship History

National Police Gazette Heavyweight World Championship
Weight limit: 200 lbs and above (91 kg)
Bobby Gunn was recognized as the Bare Knuckle Boxing lineal champion after his victory over Richie Steward in 2011. Sometime after this victory, Gunn was awarded the National Police Gazette Championship by the Bare Knuckle Boxing Hall of Fame. He then cemented his lineal championship status as he defeated Irineu Beato Costa Jr at BKFC 1 in 2018 which did not appear to be a Police Gazette Championship title defense.

National Police Gazette Heavyweight American Championship
Weight limit: 200 lbs and above (91 kg)
Arnold Adams claimed this championship by winning an 8-man tournament which was hosted by Bare Knuckle Fighting Championship.

National Police Gazette Lightweight American Championship
Weight limit: 135 lbs (61 kg)
Johnny Bedford claimed this championship by winning an 8-man tournament which was hosted by Bare Knuckle Fighting Championship.

National Police Gazette Women's Featherweight World Championship
Weight limit: 126 lbs (57 kg)
The inaugural champion, Bec Rawlings, was awarded the National Police Gazette Championship by the Bare Knuckle Boxing Hall of Fame 3 days after her historic win over Alma Garcia.

National Police Gazette Women's Featherweight American Championship
Weight limit: 126 lbs (57 kg)

See also 
 International Boxing Hall of Fame

References

External links
 Official Website
 Photo gallery on IBRO website

Allegany County, New York
Bare-knuckle boxing
Boxing museums and halls of fame
Halls of fame in New York (state)
Sports museums in New York (state)
2009 establishments in New York (state)